The Debutantes, is a 2017 Philippine supernatural horror film, directed by Prime Cruz, is an under production by Regal Films, starring Sue Ramirez, Miles Ocampo, Michelle Vito, Jane De Leon and Chanel Morales. Its first trailer was released on September 8, 2017, and the film debuted nationwide on October 4, 2017, under Regal Films. The film is Ramirez' second horror film after the Ang Manananggal sa Unit 23B.

Plot 
Kate (Sue Ramirez) is a strange and weird girl who wants to be friends with the popular girls in school - Lara (Miles Ocampo), Jenny (Jane De Leon), Candice (Michelle Vito) and Shayne (Chanel Morales). However the group prefers to bully her instead. After helping the girls with their homework, Lara invites Kate to Jenny's 18th birthday. However, the group played a prank on her during the birthday.

Kate had a nightmare about a curse and tried to warn the others but they continued bullying her aside from Lara. Soon, there was a supernatural entity that is killing the debutantes as they turn 18.

Cast 
Main
 Sue Ramirez as Kate
 Miles Ocampo as Lara
 Michelle Vito as Candice
 Jane De Leon as Jenny
 Chanel Morales as Shane

Supporting
 Paolo Gumabao as Albert
 Faye Alhambra as Wena
 Almira Muhlach as Jenny's Mother
 Iwa Moto as Kate's Aunt
Kim Qquendo as Young Kate
Juan Carlos Tamayo as Kate's Cousin
Che Ramos as Lara's Mother
PJ Anzano as Monster

Guest/Cameo's
Nicole Mari Beatrice Sales as Jenny's Party Guest
Alyssa Alyanna Bunyi as Jenny's Party Guest
Lee Ngan Vargas as Jenny's Party Guest
Jamaica Grace Morco as Jenny's Party Guest
Benjie Manansala as Jenny's Party Guest
Phamela Lucena as Jenny's Party Guest
Michael Balicas as Jenny's Party Guest
Arvie Cerbolles as Jenny's Party Guest
Raph Tuvillo as Jenny's Party Guest
Rachelle Lorica as Jenny's Party Guest

See also 
 List of ghost films
 Pagpag: Siyam na Buhay
 Haunted Mansion (2015 film)
 Bloody Crayons
 The Ghost Bride
 Shake, Rattle & Roll (film series)

References

External links
 

2017 films
2017 horror films
2010s slasher films
Philippine horror films
Philippine slasher films
2010s Tagalog-language films
Regal Entertainment films
Supernatural slasher films
2010s English-language films